Collingwood is a   nature reserve  south of Hawkhurst in Kent. It is managed by the Kent Wildlife Trust.

This reserve is woodland which has many exotic species as well as native trees. It is centred on a lake which has birds such as mallards, kingfishers and moorhens.

There is access from Stream Lane.

References

Kent Wildlife Trust